Kasimovo is a former air base in Leningrad Oblast, Russia located 30 km north of Saint Petersburg. It is an abandoned military airfield; Google Earth imagery shows that a road intersects the runway. Tenant units are unknown.

References
RussianAirFields.com

Airports in Leningrad Oblast
Soviet Air Force bases
Karelian Isthmus